Artem Zimin (born 24 March 2003) is a Belarusian professional footballer who plays for Isloch Minsk Raion.

References

External links 
 
 

2003 births
Living people
Belarusian footballers
Association football midfielders
FC BATE Borisov players
FC Isloch Minsk Raion players